Lysimachia minima (chaffweed) is a 1-4 inch (2–10 cm) perennial herb in the primula family (Primulaceae).  A cosmopolitan species, this small plant is native widely across North America and Eurasia. It can be found growing in moist soils and seasonal pools.

References

minima
Flora of Europe
Plants described in 1753
Taxa named by Carl Linnaeus